Middletown is an unincorporated community and census-designated place (CDP) in Shiawassee County in the U.S. state of Michigan.  The CDP had a population of 825 at the 2020 census. Middletown is located within Caledonia Township along M-71 between the cities of Corunna and Owosso

Geography

The Shiawassee River flows just north of Middletown.

Demographics

As of the census of 2000, there were 966 people, 374 households, and 264 families residing in the CDP. The racial makeup of the CDP was 97.52% White, 0.31% African American, 0.52% Native American, 0.21% Asian, 0.83% from other races, and 0.62% from two or more races. Hispanic or Latino of any race were 1.97% of the population.

There were 374 households, out of which 32.9% had children under the age of 18 living with them, 56.7% were married couples living together, 10.7% had a female householder with no husband present, and 29.4% were non-families. 22.5% of all households were made up of individuals, and 8.0% had someone living alone who was 65 years of age or older.  The average household size was 2.58 and the average family size was 3.02.

In the CDP, the population was spread out, with 26.1% under the age of 18, 7.1% from 18 to 24, 34.0% from 25 to 44, 21.1% from 45 to 64, and 11.7% who were 65 years of age or older.  The median age was 36 years. For every 100 females, there were 105.5 males.  For every 100 females age 18 and over, there were 100.0 males.

The median income for a household in the CDP was $32,891, and the median income for a family was $44,792. Males had a median income of $34,125 versus $22,639 for females. The per capita income for the CDP was $16,500.  About 8.3% of families and 7.7% of the population were below the poverty line, including 7.4% of those under age 18 and none of those age 65 or over.

Transportation

Major highway

Airport
 Owosso Community Airport is located just north in Caledonia Township.

References

Unincorporated communities in Shiawassee County, Michigan
Census-designated places in Michigan
Unincorporated communities in Michigan
Census-designated places in Shiawassee County, Michigan